Gostynia is a river of southern Poland, a left tributary of the Vistula. It flows through Tychy, and joins the Vistula near Bieruń.

Rivers of Poland
Rivers of Silesian Voivodeship